Mycena subcaerulea is a species of mushroom-forming fungus in the family Mycenaceae. It produces small, thin-fleshed fruitbodies with pale bluish-green caps upon slender stipes. The centers of the caps are darker in colour than the margins, and the cap cuticle can be peeled off. The fungus was first described in 1873 as Agaricus subcaeruleus by American mycologist Charles Horton Peck. His original collections, found growing on the trunks of decaying beech trees, were made in woods of the Adirondack Mountains in Upstate New York. Pier Andrea Saccardo transferred the species to the genus Mycena in 1887.

References

External links

subcaerulea
Fungi described in 1873
Fungi of North America
Taxa named by Charles Horton Peck